Barkell Platform is a narrow, level rock platform on the north end of Mawson Escarpment in Antarctica. It was named for V.G. Barkell, helicopter pilot with the survey.

References
 

Ridges of Antarctica
Landforms of Mac. Robertson Land